Masuda (written: 増田, 益田, 舛田, 桝田 or 升田) is a Japanese surname. Notable people with the surname include:

Akemi Masuda (増田明美, born 1964), Japanese long-distance runner
Akira Masuda (増田章) (born 1962), Japanese karateka
Chikashi Masuda (増田誓志, born 1985), Japanese football player
, Japanese announcer
Fusako Masuda (増田房子, born 1968), Japanese race walker
Hiroya Masuda (増田寛也, born 1951), Japanese politician
Isamu Masuda (増田勇, 1872–1945), Japanese physician
Junichi Masuda (増田順一, born 1968), Japanese video game composer
Keiko Masuda (増田恵子, born 1957), Japanese pop singer and actress
Keita Masuda (舛田圭太, born 1979), Japanese badminton player
, Japanese boxer
Kosaku Masuda (増田功作, born 1976), Japanese football player
Kosuke Masuda, Japanese artist
Kōsuke Masuda (増田こうすけ, born 1976), manga artist
Kōzō Masuda, Japanese shogi player
Mitsuhiko Masuda (増田光彦, born 1937), Japanese professional golfer
Naoya Masuda (益田直也, born 1989), Japanese professional baseball player
Nariyuki Masuda (増田成幸, born 1983), Japanese racing cyclist
Nobuhiro Masuda (増田伸洋, born 1973), Japanese professional golfer
Ryuji Masuda (増田龍治), Japanese animation director
Shigeto Masuda (増田繁人, born 1992), Japanese football player
Tadatoshi Masuda (増田忠俊, born 1973), Japanese football player
Takahiko Masuda (増田貴彦), cultural psychologist
Takahisa Masuda (増田貴久, born 1986), Japanese idol
, Japanese industrialist, investor, and art collector
, Japanese computer scientist
, Japanese basketball player
Takuya Masuda (増田卓也, born 1989), Japanese football player
Toshiki Masuda (増田 俊樹, born 1990), Japanese voice actor
Toshio Masuda (舛田利雄, born 1927), Japanese film director
Yasuhiro Masuda, Japanese shogi player
Yoneji Masuda (増田米治, 1905–1995), Japanese sociologist
Yoshio Masuda (died 2009), Japanese naval commander
, Japanese shogi player
Yuki Masuda (増田ゆき, born 1973), Japanese voice actress
Yūki Masuda (増田裕生, born 1979), Japanese voice actor
Yuri Masuda (益田祐里, born 1977), Japanese singer

Japanese-language surnames